The Ford Seattle-ite XXI was a 3/8 scale concept car designed by Alex Tremulis and displayed on 20 April 1962 on the Ford stand at the Seattle World's Fair.

Description

The car contained novel ideas that have since become reality: interchangeable fuel cell power units; interchangeable bodies; interactive computer navigation, mapping, and auto information systems; and four driving and steering wheels.   
The concept of some form of compact nuclear propulsion device was included as a possible power source on the assumption that radiation issues could be overcome without the need for prohibitively bulky shielding.

The car had six wheels, with four steerable ones at the front and two fixed ones at the rear – similar to the fictional six-wheel 1965 FAB1 and the real Tyrrell P34 racing car of the mid-1970s. The designers determined the six-wheel concept would enhance tracking, traction, and braking. It had an interchangeable front-powered section that enabled the car to be turned into either an economical city runabout or, when needed, a powerful transcontinental cruiser. All control mechanisms were through flexible couplings. Steering was by way of a fingertip-controlled dial.

See also

Twin front axle 
 Covini C6W
 FAB 1 (fictional car)
 Panther 6
 Tyrrell P34
 Bedford VAL

Twin rear axle 
 Ferrari 312T6
 March 2-4-0

References

External links 
 Copy of Ford Seattle-ite brochure
 Seattle World Fair cyber tour link showing the Ford Seattle-ite
 Link to photoset of the Ford Seattle-ite

Nuclear propulsion
Seattle-ite XXI
Century 21 Exposition
Six-wheeled vehicles